The Lightweight Java Game Library (LWJGL) is an open-source software library that provides bindings to a variety of C libraries for video game developers to Java. It exposes cross-platform libraries commonly used in developing video games and multimedia titles, such as Vulkan, OpenGL, OpenAL and OpenCL.

The primary goal of the project is to provide a way for Java developers to get access to resources that are otherwise unavailable or poorly implemented on the existing Java platform. The main philosophy is to expose underlying technology as a thin wrapper, thus creating an API close to the original. It is also the basis of many high-level Java game engines and libraries, such as libGDX or the jMonkeyEngine.

History 
Development of the library began in 2002 with the release of J2SE 1.4, making use of the newly-added non-blocking I/O operations and off-heap memory access. These additions to the JDK allowed for better access to native memory and libraries not a part of the JDK. The first official release of the library was 4 February 2007.

On 13 November 2014, version 3 was announced, which was released in alpha version on 27 April 2015 and is a complete rewrite of LWJGL. Many new bindings, including GLFW, EGL and Objective-C, were added. Support for Oculus Rift development was also added with LibOVR bindings. The new version was released on 4 June 2016, after more than 3 and a half years in development.

Bindings 
The library accesses native C code through the Java Native Interface (JNI). Bindings to each of the native libraries exist as different modules so developers can make custom builds with only the things they need in a certain program.

While utility classes are written in pure Java, most of the binding classes are automatically generated by a custom generator implemented in Kotlin.

Since version 3.1, LWJGL is fully split into 51 modules that can be downloaded and used separately. To make this process easier, the project provides an online build configurator, which allows users to download custom combinations of modules and automatically generates Maven and Gradle configuration files to ease their use with existing projects.

Notable uses
 Minecraft: Java Edition
 Project Zomboid

References

External links 
 

Cross-platform free software
Free computer libraries
Free game engines
Free software programmed in Java (programming language)
Graphics libraries
Java APIs
Java (programming language) libraries
Video game development software